Mohammad Abul Khayer was a renowned politician, freedom fighter and social worker of Bangladesh. He recorded the 7 March Speech of Bangabandhu Sheikh Mujibur Rahman. In 2014, he was awarded the "Independence and Independence War Liberation Award" for his unique general contribution to the Bangladesh Liberation War.

Personal life
Khayer was an Awami League MLA of erstwhile East Pakistan (now Bangladesh). Khairul Anam Shakil, Nazrul Sangeet singer, is his son.

Awards 
In 2014, Khayer was awarded the Independence Day Award, the highest civilian honour, for outstanding contribution to the country's independence movement and liberation war.

References 

People of the Bangladesh Liberation War
Recipients of the Independence Day Award